International Women Polytechnic (Commonly known as IWP) is an ISO 9001:2008 certified education institute in India, offering diploma courses in Fashion Design, Interior Design, NPTT, Stenography, Cosmetology and some other streams.

Campuses
 As of Oct 2015 the institution has seven campuses in India: IWP west Delhi, the academy's oldest campus at Janakpuri; IWP east Delhi, located at Gagan Vihar; IWP south Delhi, located at Lajpat Nagar; IWP north Delhi, located at Derawal Nagar; IWP Gurgaon, located at sector 14; IWP Lucknow, in Vidhan sabha marg; IWP Ghaziabad, in Raj Nagar; and the newest campus in Chandigarh located in Sec-34A.

Academics
The Academy has the following departments: Fashion Design; Interior Design; NPTT; Stenography; Cosmetology; Multimedia; Fine Arts; Counseling; Image Consulting.

IWP Diploma courses
 Interior Designing Honours in Interior Designing & Decoration
 Diploma Course in Stenography
 Certificate Course in Computer Science
 Diploma Course in Computer Science
 Honours Course In Computer Science
 Certificate Course In DTP
 Diploma Course in Multimedia
 Diploma in Fine Arts
 Diploma Course in Professional Counselling
 Diploma in Image Consulting

Festivals 
The Melange is an annual event organized by the International Women Polytechnic. It is attended by 100+ buyers from across the globe.

See also
 Fashion design
 Interior design

References

External links
 IWP website

Education companies of India